MLS Cup 2013, the 18th edition of Major League Soccer's championship match, was a soccer match which took place on Saturday, December 7, 2013 between Sporting Kansas City and Real Salt Lake at Sporting Park in Kansas City, Kansas, United States. The soccer match was to decide the winner of the 2013 season. Sporting KC were making their third appearance in the competition's final, having won in 2000 and losing in 2004. RSL were appearing in their second final, having won their only other in 2009.

It was the first MLS Cup final to be held at Sporting Park and the second time the championship match was not held at a predetermined neutral site. Sporting Kansas City won the right to host the match by besting Real Salt Lake in the regular season standings. This was the first time Kansas City hosted an MLS Cup final and the second final hosted at Sporting Park, the other being the 2012 U.S. Open Cup final.

The game was the coldest MLS match ever and was tied 1–1 after regulation time and extra time. The penalty shootout was won 7–6 by Sporting Kansas City, ending with the longest shootout in MLS Cup history at ten rounds.

Road to the final

Both teams qualified for the playoffs by finishing in the top five of their respective conferences at the end of the regular season. Sporting Kansas City then beat New England Revolution and Houston Dynamo to reach the final, while Real Salt Lake knocked out defending champions Los Angeles Galaxy and Portland Timbers.

Preparations

The 2013 Cup was the first-ever small media market cup, with both Kansas City and Salt Lake City outside of the Top 10 media markets in the US (Kansas City is #28 and Salt Lake City is #32). The tickets for the match were the highest price for the MLS Cup in the past five years, coming in at an average of $302 on the secondary market. This made it the highest priced sports event in the Kansas City area in four years, with the exception of the 2012 MLB All-Star Game.

Match

Details

Statistics

Post-match

As MLS Cup finalists, both teams were supposed to be qualified for the 2014–15 CONCACAF Champions League. Sporting Kansas City (the champion) was to be placed in pot A, and Real Salt Lake (the runner-up) was to be placed in pot B. However, on December 13, 2013, CONCACAF accepted the US Soccer/MLS proposal to change the qualification rules, so that the spot reserved for the MLS Cup runner-up  is instead awarded to the regular season conference winner that is not the Supporters' Shield champion, the Portland Timbers. Sporting Kansas City was not affected by this change.

References

2013

Real Salt Lake matches
Sporting Kansas City matches
Association football penalty shoot-outs
December 2013 sports events in the United States
2013 in sports in Kansas